Mosjøen Station is a railway station located in the town of Mosjøen in the municipality of Vefsn in Nordland county, Norway.  The station is located along the Nordland Line.  The station opened in 1940. Since 1 March 1948, the restaurant operations were taken over by Norsk Spisevognselskap.

References

External links

Railway stations in Nordland
Railway stations on the Nordland Line
Railway stations opened in 1940
1940 establishments in Norway
Vefsn